Peter Hanly (born 1964) is an Irish actor best known for his performances in Braveheart as Edward, Prince of Wales, and as Garda Ambrose Egan in the BBC TV series Ballykissangel.

Hanly's repertoire encompasses plays, television performances, as well as movies.

Personal life
Hanly attended Dublin Youth Theatre as a young teen where he started his acting career.  He continues to work as an actor in Dublin, where he lives with his wife Jennifer O'Dea and their two children.

Filmography

References

External links

1964 births
Irish male film actors
Irish male television actors
Living people
Male actors from Dublin (city)